Neolamya is a genus of fungi in the class Sordariomycetes. The relationship of this taxon to other taxa within the class is unknown (incertae sedis).

The genus name of Neolamya is in honour of Pierre Marie Édouard Lamy de la Chapelle (1804–1886), who was a French botanist.

The genus was circumscribed by Ferdinand Theissen and Hans Sydow in Ann. Mycol. vol.16 on page 29 in 1918.

Species
Neolamya ahtii 
Neolamya peltigerae 
Neolamya xanthoparmeliae

References

Sordariomycetes genera
Sordariomycetes enigmatic taxa
Taxa named by Ferdinand Theissen
Taxa named by Hans Sydow
Taxa described in 1918